The Moline Plow Company was an American manufacturer of plows and other farm implements, headquartered in Moline, Illinois, USA.

Moline Plow was formed in the 1870s when the firm of Candee & Swan, a competitor of Deere and Company (also of Moline), won a lawsuit against Deere allowing it to use the "Moline Plow" name. Reorganized under the new name, it built a line of horse-drawn plows and other implements to serve the large American agricultural market. The implement line included wagons and carriages. The company absorbed various smaller wagon and carriage building companies.

In 1915, Moline Plow purchased the Universal Tractor Company of Columbus, Ohio, manufacturer of the Universal Tractor for its patents.  Moline redesigned the tractor, and from about 1916 until 1923, the company sold the Moline Universal Tractor, which was an early attempt to serve unmet market demand for a small, light, affordable, general-purpose tractor. It was a two-wheel tractor whose trailing implement provided the rear wheels to form a four-wheel articulated unit. Its nimble design was more suitable for cultivating row crops than were most contemporary tractors and its front powered design was familiar to farmers using horses. The Moline Models B and C used a 2-cylinder opposed engine, while the model D used a 4-cylinder engine. The model D was the first production tractor to come standard with a starter and lights. The model D also utilized the Remy Governor Generator system, which used a rheostat linked to the generator as both governor and throttle.  In various advertisements the name was sometimes hyphenated as "Moline-Universal". An overview of Moline Universal design and operation, written by the company as a contributing corporate author to a 1920 how-to guide for farmers, is available in Harry W. Adams' 1920 book Adams' Common Sense Instruction On Gas Tractor Operation. Moline Plow considered the Allis-Chalmers Model 6-12, a very similar tractor, to be a patent-infringing copy.

Also around 1916, Moline Plow entered the automobile business with the Stephens brand, named after one of the founders of Moline Plow.

Around 1918 or 1919, the Willys-Overland Company purchased a majority interest in the Moline Plow Company. The company continued to function without a branding change.

The Moline Universal was a commercial success, but the unfavorable economic climate of the early 1920s, including the post–World War I recession, the depression of 1920–21, and the tractor wars, forced it out of production in 1923. The Stephens brand of automobiles ended in 1924. With the end of these two business lines, Moline Plow had divested itself from the tractor and automobile businesses, and it chose the implement line for its future focus. It changed its name to the Moline Implement Company to reflect this.

Several famous people served as executives or engineers at Moline Plow, including Frank Gates Allen, William P. Bettendorf, George Peek, and Hugh S. Johnson.

In 1929, the Moline Implement Company was merged with two other companies, the Minneapolis Steel & Machinery Company and the Minneapolis Threshing Machine Company (both of Minneapolis, Minnesota), to form the Minneapolis-Moline Power Implement Company.

References

5. http://MolinePlowCo.Com

Bibliography

 
 

Tractor manufacturers of the United States
Ploughs